The 1911 Army Cadets football team represented the United States Military Academy in the 1911 college football season. In their first and only season under head coach Joseph Beacham, the Cadets compiled a  record, shut out five of their eight opponents (including a scoreless tie with Georgetown), and outscored all opponents by a combined total of 88 to 11 – an average of 11.0 points scored and 1.4 points allowed.  The Cadets' only loss came against the Navy Midshipmen by a 3 to 0 score in the annual Army–Navy Game. 
 
Tackle Leland Devore was a consensus first-team player on the All-America team.  Other notable players on the 1911 Army team include center Franklin C. Sibert, guard Archibald Arnold, and tackle Robert Littlejohn.

Schedule

References

Army
Army Black Knights football seasons
Army Cadets football